Regina Rajchrtová, married Kordová (5 February 1968) is a former tennis player from Czechoslovakia who competed for her native country at the 1988 Summer Olympics in Seoul. On 1 April 1991 she reached a career world ranking high of 26.

Personal life
Rajchrtová married top player Petr Korda, and the two have two daughters and a son: Jessica Regina, born on February 27, 1993; Nelly, born July 28, 1998 and; Sebastian, born July 5, 2000. Jessica and Nelly are currently professional golfers, and Sebastian is a professional tennis player.

ITF finals

Singles (2–3)

Doubles (3-3)

References

External links
 
 
 

1968 births
Czech female tennis players
Czechoslovak female tennis players
Hopman Cup competitors
Living people
Olympic tennis players of Czechoslovakia
Tennis players at the 1988 Summer Olympics
Sportspeople from Havlíčkův Brod
Czech emigrants to the United States